The  Krivak class, Soviet designation Project 1135 Burevestnik (storm petrel), are a series of frigates and guard ships (patrol boats) built in the Soviet Union primarily for the Soviet Navy since 1970. Later some sub-branches, like the Nerey (Nereus) were designed for coastal patrol by the KGB Border Troops. Until 1977, the ships in the class were considered to be large anti-submarine warfare vessels.

These ships are commonly known by their NATO reporting class name of Krivak and are divided into Krivak I, Krivak II, Krivak IV (navy), and Krivak III (coast guard) classes.

History
The design started in the late 1950s and matured as an anti-submarine ship in the 1960s. The first ship was  that was commissioned in 1970.

A total of 40 ships were built, 32 ships for the Soviet Navy and 8 modified ships of the Nerey (Krivak III) subclass for the KGB Maritime Border Guard. Currently 2 vessels of the Nerey subclass are in service with the FSB Coast Guard and one was the flagship of the Ukrainian Navy (scuttled in 2022 to avoid capture).

The ship's unique features — the bow missile box, the stack and the angled mast, earned it a rap-like nickname among U. S. sailors that comes from their foreign ship silhouette identification training — "Hot dog pack, Smokestack, Knife in the Back, two Guns in the Back — Krivak."

Three ships were delivered in 2003–2004. Three more were delivered in 2011–2012.

On 12 October 2010, it was announced that the Yantar Shipyard at Kaliningrad had won a contract for construction of three new warships for the Russian Navy. The construction of the frigates for the Russian Navy will be carried out in parallel with the construction of the same-type frigates for the Indian Navy.

Variants
 Project 1135 Burevestnik (Krivak I): Design process started in 1956 as an anti-surface frigate successor to the Riga-class frigate. The role changed to an anti-submarine ship powered by gas turbines and armed with the SS-N-14 missile. The main building yards were Zhdanov Yard (now known as Northern Shipyard) (Leningrad), Yantar Yard (Kaliningrad) and Kamysh Burun Yard, (Kerch, Crimea). NATO referred to these ships as Krivak I-class. (21 ships built).
 Project 1135M Burevestnik M (Krivak II): This group of ships were fitted with single 100 mm AK-100 guns instead of the twin 76 mm AK-726 weapons of the Burevestnik design. They also had a redesigned Variable Depth Sonar (VDS) installation. All of these ships were built in Kaliningrad. NATO referred to these ships as Krivak II class. (11 ships built).
 Project 11351 Nerey (Krivak III): These ships lacked the SS-N-14 missile system, which was replaced by a helicopter and hangar, and only one 100 mm gun at the bow of the ship. All ships were built in Kerch and were intended for the Soviet Border Troops under the KGB. Two ships remain in service with the Russian FSB Coast Guard and one ship was in service with the Ukrainian Navy until being scuttled in 2022 to avoid capture. It is believed that a single incomplete Krivak III hull (Hetman Bayda Vyshnevetsky c. 1995) from Ukraine was transferred to Russia and then to the Korean People's Navy. NATO referred to these ships as Krivak III class. (8 ships built).
 Project 11352/11353 (Krivak IV): This was a modernization of the Project 1135 (Krivak I) ships Leningradski Komsomolets (renamed Legkiy in 1992), Letuchiy, Pylkiy and Zharkiy of the Krivak I group. The refit involved replacing the RBU-6000 anti-submarine mortars with SS-N-25 anti-ship missiles, new radar, sonar and ECM equipment. These ships completed their refits in 1990–1992, and others were to have been modernised but the programme was cancelled with the collapse of the Soviet Union. NATO referred to these ships after their modernization as Krivak IV class.
 Project 11356: This is an advanced derivative built for the Indian Navy from 1999 to 2012. Three improved Nerey frigates were ordered by the Indian Navy on 17 November 1997. They are known as Talwar-class frigates in Indian naval service. Three more, armed with the BrahMos missile, were ordered on 14 July 2006. (6 ships built).
 Project 11356R/M: Derivative of the Talwar class intended for the Russian Navy. Six ships were ordered for the Russian Black Sea Fleet under two contracts signed in 2010–2011, with the first ship laid down on 18 December 2010. However, due to the non-delivery of the Ukrainian gas-turbines, construction of frigates Admiral Butakov and Admiral Istomin was suspended in spring 2015. Despite earlier reports about the resumption of construction of the incomplete frigates, in October 2018, it was announced the frigates Admiral Butakov and Admiral Istomin will be sold to India under a $950 million contract signed the same month. The last frigate, the former Admiral Kornilov, is to be sold abroad. (Total: 3 ships built for the Russian Navy, 3 ships under construction for sale abroad).

Ships

Gallery

See also
 List of ships of the Soviet Navy
 List of ships of Russia by project number
 List of naval ship classes in service

References

Bibliography
  Also published as

External links

 Project "1135" in Encyclopedia of Ships 
 Project 1135 Burevestnik/Krivak class frigate at FAS.org
 1135 Krivak class at Warfare.be
 Krivak-2 Class Frigate "Pitlivy" Photo album
 Russian Navy Sinks Flagship With Parade Mine – 1995 mine accident
 All Krivak I and II Class Frigates – Complete Ship List
 All Krivak III Class Frigates – Complete Ship List

Frigate classes
 
Cold War frigates of the Soviet Union